This page list topics related to Libya.



0-9
1986 Bombing of Libya
2011 Libyan uprising

A
Ancient Libya

B
Benghazi
Buddhism in Libya

C
Cirenaica
Cirenaica italiana
Culture of Libya
Coat of arms of Libya
Christianity in Libya

D
Demographics of Libya
Disarmament of Libya

E
Elections in Libya
Economy of Libya

F
Fezzan
Flag of Libya
Foreign relations of Libya

G
Garamantes
General People's Congress (Libya)
Geography of Libya

H
Health in Libya
History of the Jews in Libya
History of Libya
History of Libya as Italian Colony
History of Libya under Muammar al-Gaddafi
HIV trial in Libya
Human rights in Libya

I
Italian Libya
Italian Libya Railways
Italian settlers in Libya
Italo-Turkish War

J
Jamahiriya

K
Kingdom of Libya
Khoms

L
Law of Libya
LGBT rights in Libya (Gay rights)
Libya and weapons of mass destruction
Libyan Arabic
Libyan Center for Remote Sensing and Space Science
Libyan Desert
Libyan Investment Authority
Libyan Navy
Limes Tripolitanus
List of heads of government of Libya
Literature of Libya

M
Municipalities of Libya
Music of Libya

N
National Oil Corporation

O
Oil reserves in Libya
Ottoman Libya
Outline of Libya

P
Pan Am Flight 103
Politics of Libya
Polygamy in Libya

Q
Quba

R
Rail transport in Libya
Railway stations in Libya
Religion in Libya
Roman Catholicism in Libya
Roman Libya

S
Subdivisions of Libya

T
Transport in Libya
Tripoli
Tripolitania
Tripolitania italiana
Tripoli italiana
Libyan tea

U
University of Libya
University of Tripoli
University of Benghazi

V
Voice of Free Libya

W
Western Desert Campaign
Wildlife of Libya
Women in Libya

X

Y

Z
Zuara
Zuara Berber

See also
Lists of country-related topics - similar lists for other countries

See :Category:Libya for the full hierarchical categorization of Wikipedia's articles on Libya. See also Portal:Contents/Indexes

Libya